Missouri City is a city in Clay County, Missouri, United States. The population was 217 at the 2020 census. It is part of the Kansas City metropolitan area.

History
Missouri City was originally named Atchison.  The earliest known use of the name was on a deed to a building from 1820.  The land was possessed by French fur traders Antoine Laffond and Bernard Laffond as early as January 24, 1807.  The name had changed to Missouri City by December 5, 1857.

The Missouri City Savings Bank Building and Meeting Hall was listed on the National Register of Historic Places in 2010.

Geography

Demographics

2010 census
As of the census of 2010, there were 267 people, 116 households, and 68 families residing in the city. The racial makeup of the city was 89.9% White, 4.1% African American, 0.7% Native American, 0.4% Asian, and 4.9% from two or more races. Hispanic or Latino of any race were 2.2% of the population.

There were 116 households, of which 25.9% had children under the age of 18 living with them, 44.0% were married couples living together, 5.2% had a female householder with no husband present, 9.5% had a male householder with no wife present, and 41.4% were non-families. 31.0% of all households were made up of individuals, and 9.5% had someone living alone who was 65 years of age or older. The average household size was 2.30 and the average family size was 2.79.

The median age in the city was 46.2 years. 17.6% of residents were under the age of 18; 8.6% were between the ages of 18 and 24; 21.7% were from 25 to 44; 38.9% were from 45 to 64; and 13.1% were 65 years of age or older. The gender makeup of the city was 54.3% male and 45.7% female.

2000 census
As of the census of 2000, there were 295 people, 110 households, and 75 families residing in the city. The population density was 290.5 people per square mile (111.7/km2). There were 120 housing units at an average density of 118.2 per square mile (45.4/km2). The racial makeup of the city was 93.56% White, 2.71% African American, and 3.73% from two or more races.

There were 110 households, out of which 29.1% had children under the age of 18 living with them, 52.7% were married couples living together, 8.2% had a female householder with no husband present, and 31.8% were non-families. 23.6% of all households were made up of individuals, and 7.3% had someone living alone who was 65 years of age or older. The average household size was 2.68 and the average family size was 3.23.

In the city the population was spread out, with 26.1% under the age of 18, 8.1% from 18 to 24, 29.8% from 25 to 44, 26.8% from 45 to 64, and 9.2% who were 65 years of age or older. The median age was 37 years. For every 100 females, there were 121.8 males. For every 100 females age 18 and over, there were 107.6 males.

The median income for a household in the city was $41,875, and the median income for a family was $45,000. Males had a median income of $30,357 versus $24,554 for females. The per capita income for the city was $17,693. About 4.2% of families and 7.6% of the population were below the poverty line, including 9.1% of those under the age of eighteen and none of those 65 or over.

References

External links
 http://www.missouricitymo.com/
 http://www.mocity.k12.mo.us/

Cities in Clay County, Missouri
Missouri populated places on the Missouri River
Populated places established in 1859
1859 establishments in Missouri
Cities in Missouri